Ingvild Gåskjenn (born 1 July 1998) is a Norwegian professional racing cyclist, who currently rides for UCI Women's Continental Team .

References

External links
 

1998 births
Living people
Norwegian female cyclists
Place of birth missing (living people)
People from Horten
Sportspeople from Vestfold og Telemark